Gary Thompson (c. 1932 – November 12, 2010) was an American basketball coach.  He served as the head basketball coach at Wichita State University from 1964 to 1971, compiling a record of 93–94.  Thompson led the Wichita State Shockers to the Final Four of the 1965 NCAA University Division basketball tournament.

Thompson died on November 12, 2010.

Head coaching record

See also
 List of NCAA Division I Men's Final Four appearances by coach

References

Year of birth uncertain
1930s births
2010 deaths
Wichita State Shockers men's basketball coaches
Wichita State Shockers men's basketball players
American men's basketball players